Touch Sensitive is the debut solo studio album by English rock musician Bruce Foxton, released on 12 May 1984 by Arista Records. Two tracks, "It Makes Me Wonder" and "Trying to Forget You (Vocal Mix)" were co-written by Foxton and Pete Glenister. The remainder of the songs are credited solely to Foxton himself. In March of the same year, fellow Jam counterpart Paul Weller released his first official studio album with the band the Style Council, titled Café Bleu. The album was notably his last recording of original material for twenty-eight years, until he released Back in the Room in 2012. Keen to establish himself as a solo artist after the breakup of the Jam, Foxton enlisted producer Steve Lillywhite to give the album a contemporary sound.

Touch Sensitive received a mixed critical reception on release and retrospectively, which have included criticism that it was too commercial in contrast to his work with the Jam. The album peaked at No. 68 on the UK Albums Chart. Three singles were issued from Touch Sensitive: "Freak", "This Is the Way", and "It Makes Me Wonder". The album's lead single, "Freak" was a minor success, peaking at No. 23 in the UK. It also provided Foxton with his only Top 40 hit.

The album was re-released on 20 August 2001 by Cherry Red Records featuring rare bonus content. The reissue was a CD with the original album digitally remastered from the original 1/2" mix tapes; the bonus content consists of three associated B-sides, including cover versions of the songs "25 or 6 to 4" by Chicago and "Get Ready" by the Temptations, as well as the song "Sign of the Times", an outtake written by Foxton. It is currently out of print physically. However, it is currently available as a digital download on Amazon, and iTunes.

Background
When Paul Weller decided to split the Jam in 1982, Foxton suddenly found himself as a solo artist with not a lot of confidence. Bolstered by his publisher, he began writing some songs and got together with session musicians to record what would eventually be known as Touch Sensitive.

Some of the musicians working with Foxton were Andy Duncan, Stan Shaw, Anthony Thistlethwaite, Roddy Lorimer, Adrian Lillywhite, and Judd Lander.

Critical reception
Reviewing for AllMusic critic Steve "Spaz" Schnee praised the album stating that the album features "top-notch pop songs with hooks galore" adding that "there are plenty of pure pop gems to satisfy any fan of '80s pop music".

Track listing

Additional tracks

Personnel

Credits are adapted from the album's liner notes.

Musicians
 Bruce Foxton — lead vocals; bass guitar
 Pete Glenister — guitars
 Andy Duncan — drums on "It Makes Me Wonder" and "You Make Me Laugh"
 Adrian Lillywhite — drums on "Freak", "This is the Way", "Are You Ready" and "Writing's On the Wall" (phase mix); inspiration on "What I'd Give"
 Stan Shaw — keyboards
 Anthony Thistlethwaite — saxophones
 Roddy Lorimer — flugelhorn; trumpet
 Judd Lander — harmonica on "It Makes Me Wonder"
 Roger Downham — vibraphone on "It Makes Me Wonder" and "Trying to Forget You" (vocal mix)
 Marek Lipski — electric violin on "Are You Ready"

Technical
 Alan Douglas, Chris Birkett, Nicholas Froome, Stephen Lipson, Will Gosling — engineer
 Adrian Peacock — photography

Chart performance
Album

Singles UK Singles Chart

References

External links
 

1984 debut albums
Bruce Foxton albums
Albums produced by Steve Lillywhite
Arista Records albums